is a railway station on the Itō Line of the East Japan Railway Company, located in the southern part of the city of Atami, Shizuoka Prefecture, Japan.

Lines
Izu-Taga Station is served by the Itō Line and is located 6.0 kilometers from the northern terminus of the line at Atami Station and 110.6 kilometers from Tokyo Station.

Layout
Izu-Taga Station has two opposing side platforms, one of which is connected directly to the station building and the other connected via an underpass. The station is unattended.

Platforms

History 
Freight services were discontinued on November 1, 1958. On April 1, 1987, along with division and privatization of the Japan National Railway, East Japan Railway Company started operating this station.

Passenger statistics
In fiscal 2013, the station was used by an average of 615 passengers daily (boarding passengers only).

Surrounding area
 Atami High School 
 Izu-Taga onsen

See also
 List of railway stations in Japan

References

External links

 Official home page 

Railway stations in Japan opened in 1935
Railway stations in Yamanashi Prefecture
Itō Line
Atami, Shizuoka